Angella Okutoyi (born 29 January 2004) is a Kenyan professional tennis player.
She became the first Kenyan to win a Grand Slam title at the girls’ juniors Wimbledon event partnering Rose Marie Nijkamp. At the 2022 Australian Open, Okutoyi became the first representative of Kenya to win a girls’ junior singles Grand Slam match.

On the ITF Circuit, she has won one doubles title. Playing for Kenya Billie Jean King Cup team, Okutoyi has a win/loss record of 2–4.

Personal life
Okutoyi and her sister were raised by their grandmother Mary as their mother died in childbirth. Her sister Roselinda Asumwa is also a tennis sensation currently playing ITF fixtures and local tournaments. Growing up, she was a constant fixture at Nairobi Club with her grandmother on the court side.

ITF finals

Singles: 1 (runner-up)

Doubles: 1 (title)

Junior career
Angella participated in the 2022 Australian Open bracket. She defeated Italian qualifier Federica Urgesi in three sets in the first round, and she continued her form against Australian qualifier Zara Larke in the second round, winning in three sets. She lost her third round match against Serbian player Lola Radivojević, 3-6, 2-6, but her performance made her the first Kenyan in the world to progress to a third round in a major. At Wimbledon, Okutoyi won the girls' doubles title with Rose Marie Nijkamp.

Junior Grand Slam titles

Doubles: 1 (title)

ITF Junior finals

Singles: 9 (6 titles, 3 runner-ups)

Doubles (11 titles, 5 runner-ups)

References

External links
 
 

Kenyan female tennis players
2004 births
Grand Slam (tennis) champions in girls' doubles
Wimbledon junior champions

Living people